Gambelia speciosa, previously classified as Galvezia speciosa, is commonly known as showy island snapdragon or showy greenbright.

It is a perennial plant, which is endemic to California chaparral and woodlands habitats on the Channel Islands in Southern California, and on Guadalupe Island west of the Baja California Peninsula in Baja California, Mexico.

It is listed as an endangered species on the California Native Plant Society Inventory of Rare and Endangered Plants of California.

The genus name of Gambelia is in honour of William Gambel (1823–1849), an American naturalist, ornithologist, and botanist. The Latin epithet of speciosa is derived from speciosus meaning showy. It was first described and published in Proc. Acad. Nat. Sci. Philadelphia Vol.4 (Mar.-Apr.) on page 7 in 1848.

Cultivation
Gambelia speciosa is cultivated as an ornamental plant for native plant, drought tolerant, and wildlife gardens. It generally prefers a sunny site and well-drained soil, with minimal summer water. The flowers attract hummingbirds.

References

External links
Calflora Database: Gambelia speciosa (Showy island snapdragon)
Jepson eFlora (TJM2) treat of Gambelia speciosa
Archived Jepson Manual (TJM93): Galvezia speciosa 
USDA Plants Profile for Gambelia speciosa
Gambelia speciosa — UC Photos gallery

speciosa
Flora of California
Flora of Baja California
Flora of Mexican Pacific Islands
Natural history of the California chaparral and woodlands
Natural history of the Channel Islands of California
Bird food plants
Garden plants of North America
Drought-tolerant plants
Plants described in 1848
Flora without expected TNC conservation status